WPV may refer to:

Workplace violence
Vienna Psychoanalytic Society (German: Wiener Psychoanalytische Vereinigung)